Heinrich Schultenjohann (born 2 November 1913, date of death unknown) was a German racing cyclist. He rode in the 1937 Tour de France.

References

External links
 

1913 births
Year of death missing
German male cyclists
Place of birth missing
Cyclists from Dortmund